Frazer may refer to:

People
Frazer (name)

Places
United States
Frazer, Montana
Frazer Township, Pennsylvania
Frazer, Pennsylvania, a community in East Whiteland Township, Pennsylvania
Frazer Corners, Wisconsin

Other uses
Frazer (automobile), a line of American automobiles
Frazer Nash, a British automobile manufacturer

See also
 Fraser (disambiguation)
 Frazier
 Frasier (disambiguation)